Phalansterium is a genus of single-celled flagellated organisms comprising several species, which form colonies. Phalansterium produces tetraspores.

Phalansterium is hard to classify; it has a distinctive ultrastructure of its pericentriolar material.  Molecular evidence places it in the Amoebozoa.

It has been suggested that it is similar to the ancestral eukaryote.

Species
Genus Phalansterium Cienkowsky 1870
 Species Phalansterium arcticum Shmakova, Karpov & Smirnov 2018
 Species Phalansterium consociatum (Fresenius 1858) Cienkowsky 1870
 Species Phalansterium digitatum Stein 1878
 Species Phalansterium filosum Cavalier-Smith & Chao 2011
 Species Phalansterium intestinum Cienkowsky 1870
 Species Phalansterium solitarium Sandon 1924

References 

Amoebozoa genera